Annals of Thoracic Medicine is a peer-reviewed medical journal published by the Saudi Thoracic Society through an agreement with the Wolters Kluwer brand Medknow Publications.  The journal publishes articles on topics within thoracic medicine, which it defines as "pulmonology, cardiology, thoracic surgery, transplantation, sleep and breathing, airways disease, and more." All articles are open access and are distributed under a Creative Commons Attribution-NonCommercial-ShareAlike license. The journal was started as a semi-annual publication in 2005 and is now published quarterly.

Annals of Thoracic Medicine is indexed with DOAJ, EMBASE, EMR Index Medicus, Pubmed Central, SCImago Journal Rank, SCOPUS, Web of Science, and Science Citation Index Expanded.

References

External links 
 

Open access journals
Quarterly journals
English-language journals
Publications established in 2006
Medknow Publications academic journals
Pulmonology journals
Academic journals associated with learned and professional societies